Prophwyd y Jubili (in English, Prophet of the Jubilee) (also called Seren y Sant or Star of the Saints) was a Welsh language monthly periodical of the Church of Jesus Christ of Latter Day Saints between 1846 and 1848. It was the first Latter Day Saint periodical that was published in a language other than English.

History
The first edition of Prophwyd y Jubili was printed in Rhydybont, Wales, in July 1846. One edition was published every month until the final issue was published in December 1848.

The editor of Prophwyd y Jubili was Dan Jones, who was presiding over the Mormon missionaries in Wales at the time. All but the final two editions of the periodical were printed on the press owned by Jones's non-Mormon older brother, the Reverend John Jones. The final two editions were published at Carmarthen on the press owned by John Davis, a young Latter Day Saint bachelor.

Prophwyd y Jubili was similar in content to the Millennial Star, the church periodical targeted towards English speaking Latter Day Saints in the British Isles. A substantial amount of material was borrowed from the Millennial Star and translated into Welsh for publication in Prophwyd y Jubili, especially doctrinal writings and letters from church leaders. Other contents were conference reports, progress in baptisms, poetry, accounts of miraculous healings, accounts of persecution and conversion, and an occasional "thumbing of the nose" at the enemy's lack of success in forestalling the spread of Mormonism in Wales. In almost every issue, there is a defense against an attack on Mormonism that had been printed in one of the other Christian periodicals in Wales.

The only fact known about the circulation of Prophwyd y Jubili is a comment made by Dan Jones at a December 1847 church meeting where he comments that he had increased the circulation to 1200. The cover price of Prophwyd y Jubili was originally three pence, which was cut to two pence with the January 1847 edition. Prophwyd y Jubili ceased publication when Dan Jones ended his first Welsh mission and returned to the United States. In 1849, Udgorn Seion succeeded Prophwyd y Jubili as the official Welsh language periodical of the church; the new periodical was edited by John Davis.

Full name
The complete name of the periodical was Prophwyd y Jubili, neu, Seren y Saint; yn cynnwys hanes sefydliad "Goruchwyliaeth cyflawnder yr amseroedd," ynghyd ag erlidigaethau, merthyrdod, ac alltudiaeth ei hufyddion, a'u llwyddiant (in English Prophet of the Jubilee, or, Star of the Saints; containing an account of the establishment of the "Dispensation of the fulness of times," together with the persecutions, martyrdom, and exile of its adepts, and their success).

See also
List of Latter Day Saint periodicals

Notes

References
 Prophet of the Jubilee, on WelshMormonHistory.org

Further reading

Defunct newspapers published in the United Kingdom
The Church of Jesus Christ of Latter-day Saints periodicals
Publications established in 1846
Publications disestablished in 1848
The Church of Jesus Christ of Latter-day Saints in Wales
Welsh-language literature
1846 in Christianity
1846 establishments in Wales